Auldbar Road railway station was located near the town of Guthrie in the Scottish county of Angus.

History
Opened by the Arbroath and Forfar Railway, and absorbed into the Caledonian Railway, it became part of the London, Midland and Scottish Railway during the Grouping of 1923. Passing on to the Scottish Region of British Railways on nationalisation in 1948, it was then closed by the British Transport Commission.

The site today
Although the wooden buildings on the platforms have gone the platforms, and some other buildings such as the station house and signal box remain.

References

Notes

Sources 
 
 
 
 Auldbar Road station on navigable O. S. map
 Disused stations

External links
 RAILSCOT on Arbroath and Forfar Railway

Disused railway stations in Angus, Scotland
Railway stations in Great Britain opened in 1838
Railway stations in Great Britain closed in 1956
Former Caledonian Railway stations
1838 establishments in Scotland
1956 disestablishments in Scotland